Alain Joyandet (born 15 January 1954) is a French politician who was appointed Secretary of State for Cooperation and Francophony in the government of François Fillon from 18 March 2008 to July 2010.  Prior to that, he was CEO of the Société Nouvelle des Éditions Comtoises (SNEC), a publisher of weekly newspapers and journals. He is a journalist by training.

He has been mayor of Vesoul since 1995 and senator of Franche-Comté from 1995 to 2002.

In 2010, he won the UMP nomination for President of Franche-Comté, but lost to socialist candidate Marie-Guite Dufay in the general election.

Political career

Governmental functions

Secretary of State for Cooperation and Francophony : 2008-2010 (Resignation on 4 July 2010).

Electoral mandates

Senate of France

Senator of Haute-Saône : 1995-2002 (Resignation, became a member of the National Assembly of France in 2002).

National Assembly of France

Member of the National Assembly of France for Haute-Saône (1st constituency) : 2002-2008 (Became secretary of State in 2008) / Since 2010. Elected in 2002, reelected in 2007.

Regional Council

Leader of the Opposition in the Regional Council : March–July 2010.

Regional councillor of Franche-Comté : march-July 2010 (Resignation).

General Council

General councillor of Haute-Saône : 1992-2002 (Resignation). Reelected in 1998.

Municipal Council

Mayor of Vesoul : since 1995. Reelected in 2001, 2008.

Municipal councillor of Vesoul : since 1989. Reelected in 1995, 2001, 2008

Controversy 
At the end of March 2010 Joyandet made headlines for spending 116,500 euros of taxpayers' money chartering a private jet to fly him to Martinique to an international conference on Haiti and back to Paris.

On 4 July 2010, he resigned his government post, the same day as Christian Blanc, Secretary of State for Development of the capital region. The French press had reported the suspected misuse of public money by the two ministers. Alain Joyandet was accused of renting a private jet to €116,500 to travel to Martinique, where he was to attend an international conference for reconstruction after the earthquake of Haiti. An article in the Canard Enchaîné also suspected of having received an illegal building permit for his house of Grimaud, which he abandoned shortly after.

Notes

References
 Biography on the French Ministry of Foreign Affairs website

|-

|-

|-

|-

 

|-

 

1954 births
Living people
Politicians from Dijon
Mayors of places in Bourgogne-Franche-Comté
People from Vesoul
Government ministers of France
French Senators of the Fifth Republic
Union for a Popular Movement politicians
Deputies of the 12th National Assembly of the French Fifth Republic
Deputies of the 13th National Assembly of the French Fifth Republic
Senators of Haute-Saône
Regional councillors of Bourgogne-Franche-Comté